Jean-Jacques Antier, (born in Rouen on 6 October 1928) is a French journalist. He worked in for various publications such as Paris Normandie and Cols bleus. He authored a number of books on naval and maritime History. He also published a number of biographies, novels and spirituality books under the pseudonym Jean-Jacques.

Works

Maritime History 

 L'Amiral de Grasse : Plon, 1965
 Grandes heures de la marine : Waleffe, 1967
 Les Porte-avions et la Maîtrise des mers : Éditions Robert Laffont, 1967
 Histoire mondiale des sous-marins : Éditions Robert Laffont, 1968
 Histoire maritime de la première guerre mondiale : Éditions France-Empire, 1992
 Marins de Provence et du Languedoc : Aubanel, 1977
 Les Sous-mariniers : Grancher, 1977
 Les Sous-mariniers des temps héroïques : Idégraph Genève, 1980
 Les Combattants de la guerre maritime 1914-1918 : Idégraph Genève, 1980
 Au temps des voiliers long-courriers : France-Empire, 1979
 Au temps des premiers paquebots à vapeur : France-Empire, 1982
 Histoire de l'aviation navale : Presses de la Cité, 1983
 L'Aventure héroïque des sous-marins français : Éditions maritimes et d’outre mer, 1984
 Le Porte-avions Clemenceau : Ouest-France, 1984
 Les Convois de Mourmansk ; Presses de la Cité, 1981
 La Bataille de Malte : Presses de la Cité, 1982
 La Bataille des Philippines : Presses de la Cité, 1985
 L'aventure kamikaze : Presses de la Cité, 1986
 Pearl Harbor : Presses de la Cité, 1988
 Le Drame de Mers el-Kébir : Presses de la Cité, 1990
 La Flotte se saborde : Presses de la Cité, 1992

Spirituality 

 Lérins, l'île sainte de la Côte d'Azur : Ed. SOS 1973 et 1988
 Carrel cet inconnu : Wesmael 1970
 Le Pèlerinage retrouvé : Éditions du Centurion 1979
 La Soif de Dieu : Éditions du Cerf 1981
 L'Appel de Dieu : Cerf 1982
 Les Pouvoirs mystérieux de la foi : Éditions Perrin 1992 (avec Jean Guitton)
 Le Livre de la sagesse : Perrin 1998 (avec Jean Guitton)
 Enquête sur le mysticisme féminin : Perrin 2000

Biographies 

 Marthe Robin, le voyage immobile : France Loisirs 1992
 Alexis Carrel, la tentation de l'absolu : Éditions du Rocher 1994
 Charles de Foucauld : Perrin 1997
 La Vie de Jean Guitton : Perrin 1999
 La Vie du curé d'Ars : Perrin 2000
 C.G. Jung : Presses de la Renaissance 2010
 Pierre Teilhard de Chardin ou la force de l'amour : Presses de la Renaissance 2011

Regional History 

 Le Comté de Nice : France-Empire 1972 et 1992
 La Côte d'Azur, ombres et lumières : France-Empire 1972
 Les Îles de Lérins : Solar 1974 et 1979
 Grandes heures des îles de Lérins : Perrin 1975
 Histoires d'amour de la Côte d'Azur : Presses de la Cité 1976

Novels 

 Opération avion sous-marin, Laffont, 1968
 La Meute silencieuse, Laffont, 1969
 Les Prisonniers de l'horizon, France-Empire, 1971
 Les Évadés de l'horizon, Hachette (Bibliothèque verte), 1973
 Les Seigneurs de la mer, France-Empire, 1976 (réédité en Bibliothèque verte sous le titre La Plus Belle Course transatlantique)
 La Croisade des innocents, Presses de la Cité, 1996
 Autant en apporte la mer, Presses de la Cité, 1993
 Le Rendez-vous de Marie-Galante, Presses de la Cité, 2000
 Marie Galante, la liberté ou la mort, Presses de la Cité, 2002
 Le Sixième Condamné de l'Espérance, Presses de la Cité, 2004
 La Dame du grand mat, Presses de la cité, 2004
 Tempête sur Armen, Presses de la cité, 2007 - Prix Corail du livre de mer 2008
 La Fille du carillonneur, Presses de la Cité, Paris, 2009 
 La Prisonnière des mers du Sud : Presses de la Cité 2009
 Blanche du Lac, Calmann-Lévy, 2010
 Le Convoi de l'espoir, Calmann-Lévy, 2013
 La Fiancée du Kamikaze, Calmann-Lévy, 2014

Lycée Pierre-Corneille alumni
20th-century French writers
Winners of the Prix Broquette-Gonin (literature)
1928 births
Living people